Rick Allain (born May 20, 1969) is a former Canadian ice hockey coach.  Allain's coaching career followed three seasons as a defenceman for the Maine Mariners/Providence Bruins franchise in the American Hockey League.

Coaching career
Allain made the transition to coaching in 1997, when he spent a season as assistant coach for the Guelph Storm in the junior-level Ontario Hockey League (OHL).  The following season he accepted the head coach position with the Peterborough Petes of the OHL, where he coached for six seasons, 1998–2004.  Under his command the Petes had a record of 191–179–38.

In 2004 Allain moved to Florida.  In the summer of 2006 he assumed the position of head coach for the Jacksonville Barracudas of the Southern Professional Hockey League, a position he held until the conclusion of the 2007-08 SPHL season, in which the Barracudas requested a one-year suspension from the SPHL due to "not having a suitable venue in for SPHL hockey in North Florida."

Allain was named as Hockey Operations Advisor to the Augusta RiverHawks on April 23, 2010.

Awards and honours

References

External links 

1969 births
Boston Bruins draft picks
Canadian ice hockey coaches
Canadian ice hockey defencemen
Ice hockey people from Ontario
Johnstown Chiefs players
Kitchener Rangers players
Living people
Maine Mariners players
Providence Bruins players
Sportspeople from Guelph